Laura Gómez Gutiérrez is a retired Spanish football defender who played for Sporting de Huelva. Gomez was often called the female Carlos Puyol.

Honours

Club
Barcelona
Primera División: 2013–14, 2014–15
Copa de la Reina: 2014

References 

Spanish women's footballers
FC Barcelona Femení players
Primera División (women) players
Living people
Real Sociedad (women) players
People from Zarautz
Women's association football defenders
21st-century Spanish women
Year of birth missing (living people)